Peter Momtchiloff (born 10 March 1962) is a British guitarist and bassist.

He was educated at Winchester College and Worcester College, Oxford.

His musical career began in 1978 playing bass guitar in Winchester band The Big Figure. At Oxford he continued as a bass player and vocalist in Ron and His Beat Busters (under the name Miguel Horton) and Communist Alliance. These outfits played a combination of cover versions and original material with new wave, R&B and rockabilly influences. As a guitarist he played in country blues trio The Shovel Robinson King Biscuit Country Blue Band.

Momtchiloff was a founding member of the seminal twee pop bands Talulah Gosh, Heavenly, and its later incarnation Marine Research. In 1999, he joined Jessica Griffin in her band the Would-Be-Goods.

He has also played guitar for Scarlet's Well, Les Clochards, and Hot Hooves.

In 2014 he formed a band called Tufthunter to record an album of his songs, each sung by a different singer.  This album was released in 2015 under the title 'Deep Hits'.

Since 1993 Momtchiloff has been the Senior Commissioning Editor for Philosophy at Oxford University Press.

References

External links
Contact information at Oxford University Press
Tufthunter website with free album download

1962 births
Living people
British male guitarists
British bass guitarists
British editors
People educated at Winchester College
Oxford University Press people
Male bass guitarists